Rossendale General Hospital was an acute general hospital at Rawtenstall in Lancashire. It was managed by the East Lancashire Hospitals NHS Trust.

History
The hospital has its origins in an infirmary established to support Haslingden Workhouse in 1912. This infirmary was initially known as the Moorlands Infirmary and, after it had taken over the old workhouse, it became Moorlands Public Assistance Infirmary in 1945. It was renamed Rossendale General Hospital on joining the National Health Service in 1948. After services moved to the new Rossendale Primary Healthcare Centre, the hospital closed in September 2010. The workhouse and infirmary buildings were all demolished in late 2013 and the site was subsequently developed by Taylor Wimpey for residential use.

References

Buildings and structures in the Borough of Rossendale
Hospitals in Lancashire
Defunct hospitals in England